The Nintendo 64 controller (model number: NUS-005) is the standard game controller for the Nintendo 64 home video game console. Manufactured and released by Nintendo on June 23, 1996, in Japan, in late 1996 in North America, and 1997 in Europe, it is the successor to the Super Nintendo controller and is designed in an "M" shape and features 10 buttons, one analog "Control Stick" and a directional pad.

Design

The controller was designed by Nintendo R&D3, under direction to try new ideas that would break from typical game controllers. With original visual designs having been mocked up in clay form, and extensive test group studies being performed before and during the design phase, the Nintendo 64's controller design was eventually solidified in tandem with that of Miyamoto's gameplay mechanics in Super Mario 64.

Nintendo of America's head designer, Lance Barr, said that the design studies revealed that "most games use a few buttons for most of the main controls, such as jumping and shooting, or accelerating and braking. That's why the A and B Buttons are placed for easiest access on the new controller and why they are larger than the other buttons.  They're the buttons that get high traffic."

The controller was designed to be held in three different positions. First, it can be held by the two outer grips, allowing use of the D-pad, right-hand face buttons and the "L" and "R" shoulder buttons (but not the Z trigger or analog stick). This style was intended to optimize play in 2D games by emulating the setup on the Super NES controller. It can be also held by the center and right-hand grip, allowing the use of the single control stick, the right hand-buttons, the "R" shoulder button, and the Z trigger on the rear (but not the "L" shoulder button or D-pad). This style was intended for 3D games. Finally, the controller can be held by the center and left-hand grip, allowing for a combination of the D-pad, L shoulder, analog stick, and Z trigger, as was implemented in GoldenEye 007. Additionally, though the controller was not designed with this setup in mind, one controller can be held in each hand with a thumb on each analog stick and index fingers on the Z trigger. This setup allows dual-analog control on some first-person shooters such as Perfect Dark. In some games such as Mortal Kombat Trilogy, the control stick and directional pad are interchangeable. Very few games use the directional pad exclusively, such as Tetrisphere and Kirby 64: The Crystal Shards.

This design is controversial, as by its nature it generally prevents the use of all of its features with the player's hands in any one position; the D-pad, L-shoulder, analog stick and Z-trigger cannot, generally, all be used at the same time as it typically requires the player to switch hand positions, taking the hands off of the key directional controls. Some, though, realized they can hold the controller with the outer grips and use their index fingers for the R and L triggers, middle fingers for the Z-trigger, right thumb for the right-hand buttons, and left thumb for the D-pad and (stretching) analog stick, without changing hand positions. When Sony released its Dual Analog and DualShock controllers for the competing PlayStation, it retained the original controllers' two-handled ergonomics, placing the analog sticks below and inside the primary D-pad and face buttons, allowing the player to quickly switch from the D-pad and face buttons to the analog sticks without letting go of the controller. Several third-party manufacturers would produce aftermarket Nintendo 64 controllers with similar layouts to the Dual Analog/DualShock, such as the MakoPad and Hori Mini. Nintendo would largely follow suit with the stock controller for its GameCube console, but swapped the positions of the analog stick and D-pad. Such a layout would become dominant in gamepad design, as by that time the left analog stick had become universally accepted as the primary movement control on 3D games across all consoles.

The controller has four "C buttons" on the top, which were originally intended to control the camera in three-dimensional game environments. However, since the pad only contains three other face buttons, the C-buttons often became assigned to ulterior functions. An example of this is The Legend of Zelda: Ocarina of Time, where three of the C-buttons can be assigned to secondary items and the upper C-button is used to call Navi for assistance, while the Z-trigger is used to lock focus onto enemies and center the camera behind the player.

One game, Robotron 64, allows one player to use two controllers to control an avatar. This way, the game plays like its predecessor, Robotron 2084. Star Wars Episode I: Racer, GoldenEye 007 and Perfect Dark also use this set up for slightly different gameplay experiences (in terms of control, at least) compared to the standard single controller option.

The controller initially came in six colors (grey, black, red, green, yellow and blue) but other colors were released later, many of them coinciding with the release of a similarly colored or designed system. Some of these others include smoke black, watermelon red, jungle green, fire orange, ice blue, grape purple, and special edition colors like gold, atomic purple, extreme green, "Donkey Kong 64" banana bunch yellow, "Pokémon" blue and yellow, and "Millennium 2000" platinum. Players would often take apart Nintendo 64 controllers to mix-and-match the tops and bottoms of the shell, creating bi-color controllers.

When the Nintendo 64 is switched on, the joystick on each controller is automatically calibrated by recording the current position as the center position. That works assuming the hands are off the joystick when the Nintendo 64 is powered on. The joystick can also be recalibrated while the Nintendo 64 is on, by pressing L+R+START to indicate that the current position of the joystick is the center position.

Analog stick

The Nintendo 64 controller was one of the first game controllers to incorporate analog stick technology as a main feature, intended to provide the user with a wider range of functions such as mobility and camera control. The stick is designed to detect 360 independent directions, compared to the 8 independent directions detected by a D-pad, allowing the potential for Nintendo 64 games to more accurately emulate 360° of motion.

Analog joysticks prior to the Nintendo 64 include those used by the Atari 5200, Sega's arcade systems, Sega's analog Mission Stick for the Saturn (1995), and Sony's PlayStation Analog Joystick (1996). The Nintendo 64 controller distinguished itself from these precursors by using an analog thumbstick, which was predated only by the Mega Drive's XE-1 AP, designed by third-party manufacturer Dempa in 1989. The Nintendo 64 controller was released contemporaneously with Sega's 3D Pad for their Saturn system, and was followed during the fifth generation of video game consoles by Sony's Dual Analog and DualShock controllers for the PlayStation console.

The analog stick uses a pair of optical encoding disks to determine its position, similar to how ball mice work. Since optical encoding disks only give the system relative changes in the position of the analog stick, the system assumes that the stick is centered during power-on and tracks relative movements from there. If things get out of sync, or if the control stick was not centered during power-on, the center position can be reset by pressing the left and right shoulder buttons (L and R) at the same time as the Start button. While the optical encoding disks are mostly digital and provide very accurate relative movements, third party controllers and joysticks often use cheaper potentiometers instead. These allow the controller to track the absolute position of the joystick, but since the signal is analog, it is very noisy and can fluctuate even if the joystick is not moved.

Controller Pak

The Controller Pak is Nintendo's external memory card, similar to those used on the PlayStation and other CD-ROM consoles. Though the Nintendo 64's cartridges can store battery-backed memory much like its predecessors, in supported games the Controller Pak allows save game data to be stored separately from the cartridge; for instance allowing save data to be used with a different copy of the game, or to store data that will not fit on a cartridge's battery-backed memory (such as Mario Kart 64s ghost data). Whereas other console developers opted to plug the memory card directly into a console, Nintendo opted to have the card be plugged into the controller and thus transported as one unit, envisioning scenarios in which players would want to bring their own controller and memory card to play with other Nintendo 64 owners. In such scenarios having the cartridge port on the controller would allow individual players to each use their own distinct game settings and controller configurations while playing simultaneously on the same system.

Rumble Pak

The original Rumble Pak, designed for the Nintendo 64 controller, was released in April 1997 to coincide with the release of Star Fox 64 and requires two AAA batteries. It provides haptic feedback during gameplay, intending to make the gaming experience more engaging. It was designed to be inserted into the controller's memory cartridge slot, which prevents the use of the Controller Pak. The insertion of a Controller Pak is prompted at every point of save in case one was not already in place.

LodgeNet variant

In 1999, LodgeNet and Nintendo released a controller and game playing service for various hotels in the United States. It is a slightly modified Nintendo 64 controller featuring an improved GameCube-style analog control stick, and LodgeNet TV control buttons. It attaches to the hotel television and is not compatible with a standard Nintendo 64 console. It functions as a secondary remote control for the television, with up and down on the D-pad able to change channels, and as a controller for available Nintendo 64 games on the LodgeNet service. Customers could choose from a large library of Nintendo 64 games, including most first-party Nintendo 64 games, and play at a rate of $6.95 for every 60 minutes.

Reception
Nintendo's own magazine, Nintendo Power, reviewed the controller.  The magazine said that it is "a little wider than the Super NES controller, but it felt very comfortable and the control elements were exceptionally well-placed. Large and small hands alike found it easy to manipulate." In their overview of the controller, Electronic Gaming Monthly commented, "All in all, Nintendo has made the most advanced and easy-to-use controller we have ever seen. It is extremely versatile and has enough buttons to take care of every possible contingency, now or in the future." GamePros overview stated, "The N64's tri-handled controller may look weird, but it feels great." Third party developers were reportedly enthusiastic about the controller as well. Dave Perry called it "the big special move that [Nintendo] have gone for", while Jez San said that "The joystick is unusual looking but I like the controls. The thumb control feels nice and strong and also sensitive."

Stocks of extra Nintendo 64 controllers were sold out on the Japanese launch of the Nintendo 64, despite the fact that all three launch games are single-player only. Similar results followed in North America; retailers reported extremely high sales of the controllers despite only a handful of multiplayer games being available.

Intense rotating of the analog stick reportedly resulted in friction injuries to the hands of some players of 1998's Mario Party. As a result of a settlement with the New York Attorney General, Nintendo offered protective gloves to prevent injuries. In Q1 2000, Nintendo reported that out of more than 1 million copies sold in the year since the game's release, the company had received about 90 complaints, none serious. Tim Weaver, editor of the UK's N64 Magazine, said his staff experienced no problems with the controller, adding that the entire investigation was "ludicrous" and "could only happen in America".

Nintendo Switch version
Nintendo released a version of the Nintendo 64 controller compatible with its Nintendo Switch console in October 2021. The controller was released in conjunction with an additional tier of the company's Nintendo Switch Online service, called the "Expansion Pack," which gives customers access to a catalog of Nintendo 64 games. The new version makes a series of changes to the design including the addition of wireless functionality and the incorporation of a rumble feature without the need for an additional accessory like the Rumble Pak.

The Switch version also adds additional buttons to allow players access to the home and capture buttons that correspond with Switch functionality that was not available on Nintendo 64.

See also
 List of Nintendo controllers

Notes

References

External links

Nintendo 64 accessories
Nintendo controllers
Products introduced in 1996
Game controllers